Lego Star Wars: The Complete Saga is a Lego-themed action-adventure video game based on the Lego Star Wars line of toys. It is a combination of the game Lego Star Wars: The Video Game (2005) and its sequel Lego Star Wars II: The Original Trilogy (2006), which span the first six episodes of the Skywalker Saga. The game was announced by LucasArts on 25 May 2007 at Celebration IV and was released for the Xbox 360, PlayStation 3, Wii, and Nintendo DS on 6 November 2007 in North America. The game was later released on Microsoft Windows on 13 October 2009, macOS on 12 November 2010, iOS on 11 December 2013, and for Android on 1 January 2015.

Gameplay 

The objective of the game is to successfully progress through each episode while collecting Gold Bricks. The Complete Saga spans the events that take place from the Trade Federation negotiations above Naboo in Star Wars Episode I - The Phantom Menace (1999) to the Rebel attack on the second Death Star above Endor in Return of the Jedi (1983).

Like in Lego Star Wars II: The Original Trilogy, the hub world takes place in the Mos Eisley Cantina. The Cantina has doors that allows the player to enter the levels for Episodes I-VI, the bonus levels, the Bounty Hunter missions, and the Arcade games. The Cantina features a character customizer, a key feature from Lego Star Wars II.

In all versions of the game except for the Nintendo DS version, there are 160 gold bricks to collect; 120 of these are for the main levels. There are three for each of the levels. One is for completing the level in story mode, the second is for achieving "True Jedi" status by collecting a certain amount of studs/coins, and the third is by collecting 10 LEGO "minikit" canisters, which are hidden across the level. For iOS, there are 200 Gold Bricks overall with an additional gold brick available for each level with the completion of a challenge mode where the player must find the 10 hidden blue Minikits in 20 minutes. The iOS version also offers 12 gold bricks by completing the arcade games in the lobby.

There are 20 gold bricks for completing the Bounty Hunter missions, which involve capturing key figures of the Old Republic and Rebellion for Jabba the Hutt. There are 6 further gold bricks for completing the bonus missions (10 in the iOS version) and another 14 available to purchase at the Cantina (8 in the iOS version).

Overall, there are 36 story levels, 20 bounty hunter missions, and 6 bonus levels (two Lego City levels, two story levels (Anakin's Flight and A New Hope, the latter of which was a special unlockable level found in Lego Star Wars: The Video Game), and the original Mos Espa Pod Race and Gunship Cavalry levels).

Most of the story levels are the same as those found in their respective original games. The Complete Saga also includes two previously scrapped levels: "Anakin's Flight" and "Bounty Hunter Pursuit," which were intended to appear in Lego Star Wars: The Video Game but were cut during development. "Anakin's Flight" is based on the Naboo space battle against the droid control ship seen in The Phantom Menace. It was originally envisioned as a rail-shooter level, but was changed to the free-roam style used in almost all vehicles levels in the game. "Bounty Hunter Pursuit," focuses on Obi-Wan Kenobi and Anakin Skywalker pursuing bounty hunter Zam Wesell across Coruscant from Attack of the Clones. It was also made into a free-roam level, but unlike "Anakin's Flight" was incorporated into Episode II. The "Mos Espa Podrace" and "Gunship Cavalry" story levels were redesigned, although the versions from their respective original games are present as bonus levels. "Battle Over Coruscant," though, remains the same, with the change that players can change vehicles in Free Play. 

New additions to The Complete Saga include a 2-player Battle Arena mode called "Arcade Mode", new Minikit vehicle bonus missions, the red power bricks from Lego Star Wars II: The Original Trilogy returning and being incorporated into the prequel trilogy levels, and 10 additional bounty hunter missions add new challenges to the Prequel trilogy portions originally seen in Lego Star Wars: The Video Game.

The Episodes I, II, and III levels have been updated so that characters can build and ride vehicles, wear helmets and gain access to bounty hunter and Stormtrooper areas. Prequel trilogy characters now have the ability to dodge blaster fire and have their own special melee attack (for example, Chewbacca rips off arms). New Force moves were added, Force Lightning and Force Choke. New characters have also been added, bringing the total up to 128. Indiana Jones is an unlockable playable character to foreshadow and promote Lego Indiana Jones: The Original Adventures.

Development 
Traveller's Tales created The Complete Saga in response to the success of the original game and its sequel with LucasArts publishing the game. They combined the two games while also updating graphics, as well as adding new levels, characters, and new costume elements for customizable characters.

While The Complete Saga targeted major seventh-generation platforms, Traveller's Tales ruled out the possibility of a PlayStation Portable version on the grounds that the developers did not have enough resources to make it.

Reception 

The game received "favourable" reviews on all platforms according to the review aggregation website Metacritic. In Japan, where the PlayStation 3 and Wii versions were ported and published by Activision on 27 March 2008, Famitsu gave them each a score of three eights and one seven for a total of 31 out of 40.

In April 2009, the game was the fourth-highest selling on the Wii, and ninth for the DS. By 2 May 2009, the game's worldwide sales total exceeded 3.4 million. By June 2010, the game had achieved an ELSPA Gold sales award, indicating sales of 200,000 units in the UK. As of February 2017, the game is the best-selling Star Wars video game of all-time, with sales of 15.29 million. It was the best-selling Lego video game of all-time until being surpassed by Lego Marvel Super Heroes in 2017.

Guinness World Records Gamer's Edition 2009 ranked The Complete Saga as the 23rd greatest video game of all time. The game was nominated for Favorite Video Game at the 2012 Kids' Choice Awards, but lost to Just Dance 3. The Nintendo DS version, which sold 4.7 million units, is the best-selling third party game of all time for the platform.

References

External links 
 
 

2007 video games
3D platform games
Action-adventure games
Android (operating system) games
The Empire Strikes Back video games
Feral Interactive games
IOS games
Star Wars: The Complete Saga
Lego Star Wars
LucasArts games
MacOS games
Video game reboots
Nintendo DS games
PlayStation 3 games
Return of the Jedi video games
Star Wars video games
Traveller's Tales games
Video game compilations
Video games set on fictional planets
Wii games
Windows games
Xbox 360 games
Video games directed by Jon Burton
Video games developed in the United Kingdom
Multiplayer and single-player video games